In Greek mythology, Thermodosa (Ancient Greek: Θερμώδωσα) was one of the Amazons, a race of warrior-women. She came with their queen, Penthesilia to the Trojan War.

Mythology 
During the siege of Troy, Thermodosa was slayed by the Cretan warrior Meriones, son of Molus."Then, as Evandre through the murderous fray with Thermodosa rushed, stood Meriones, a lion in the path, and slew: his spear right to the heart of one he drave, and one stabbed with a lightning sword-thrust 'twixt the hips: leapt through the wounds the life, and fled away."

Notes

References 

 Quintus Smyrnaeus, The Fall of Troy translated by Way. A. S. Loeb Classical Library Volume 19. London: William Heinemann, 1913. Online version at theio.com
 Quintus Smyrnaeus, The Fall of Troy. Arthur S. Way. London: William Heinemann; New York: G.P. Putnam's Sons. 1913. Greek text available at the Perseus Digital Library.

Amazons of the Trojan war
Women in Greek mythology